Kent City High School is a high school located in Kent City, Michigan. The principal of the school is Bill Crane. The athletic teams are known as the Eagles.  They compete in the Central State Activities Association in its Silver Division.

The first graduating class was 1909.

Sports 
The Kent City football team has won the CSAA Silver in 2016, 2017, and 2018. They are coached by the school's principal, Bill Crane.

Activities 
The Kent City Marching Eagles have gotten 3rd at state finals in the years 2016, 2017, and 2018. In 2019, they became MCBA Flight V State Champs.

The Kent City Quiz Bowl team won NAQT Nationals in 2002.

References

External links
Official website

Public high schools in Michigan
Schools in Kent County, Michigan
1909 establishments in Michigan